Hyattville is a ghost town in Anderson County, Kansas, United States.

History
A town called Hyatt in Anderson County had a post office from 1857 until 1867.

References

Further reading

External links
 Anderson County maps: Current, Historic, KDOT

Geography of Anderson County, Kansas
Ghost towns in Kansas